Kudakwashe Munyede (born 30 April 1991) is a Zimbabwean first-class cricketer who plays for Mid West Rhinos. He made his Twenty20 debut for Zimbabwe against Eastern Province in the 2016 Africa T20 Cup on 30 September 2016. In December 2020, he was selected to play for the Eagles in the 2020–21 Logan Cup.

References

External links
 

1991 births
Living people
Zimbabwean cricketers
Mashonaland Eagles cricketers
Mid West Rhinos cricketers
Sportspeople from Harare